Pseudochlorothecium is a genus of green algae in the order Chlamydomonadales.

References

Chlamydomonadales
Chlamydomonadales genera